Huai Rong Railway Halt is a railway halt located in Wang Manao Subdistrict, Pak Tho District, Ratchaburi.

Services 
 Ordinary 251/252 Bang Sue Junction-Prachuap Khiri Khan-Bang Sue Junction

References 
 
 

Railway stations in Thailand
Ratchaburi province